Echeveria peacockii is a scientific name that has been used for two plants:
Dudleya pulverulenta, for which it is a synonym
Echeveria desmetiana, for which it is an illegitimate name